Charles "Charlie" Noll Reymann (born January 29, 1995) is an American soccer player.

Career

Youth and college 
Reymann played four years of college soccer at the University of Kentucky between 2013 and 2016, where he made 80 appearances and tallied 21 assists.

Reymann also played with Premier Development League side Reading United AC in 2016.

Professional 
Reymann signed with United Soccer League side Bethlehem Steel on March 2, 2017.

References

External links 
 Bethlehem Steel FC player profile

1995 births
Living people
American soccer players
Kentucky Wildcats men's soccer players
Reading United A.C. players
Philadelphia Union II players
Association football defenders
Soccer players from Ohio
USL League Two players
USL Championship players